is a professional Go player.

Biography 
Honda became a professional in 1961. He was promoted to 9 dan in 1973. He won the Kansai Ki-in's Oteai four times. He also visited China twice, in 1973 and 1985 for Go related business.

Titles & runners-up

External links
GoBase Profile
Sensei's Library Profile

1945 births
Japanese Go players
Living people